Stephen Sherrill House is a historic home located at East Hampton in Suffolk County, New York. It was built in 1857 and is a frame Greek Revival / Italianate residence. It is a two-story, gable front, side entrance residence with a three bay wide front facade. Also on the property is the former kitchen wing believed to date to 1802 and moved to its present location in 1927, and a wind pump tower.

It was added to the National Register of Historic Places in 1996.

Gallery

References

Houses on the National Register of Historic Places in New York (state)
1800s architecture in the United States
Houses in Suffolk County, New York
Houses completed in 1857
National Register of Historic Places in Suffolk County, New York
1857 establishments in New York (state)